Sean Gannon may refer to:
 Sean Gannon (footballer), Irish footballer
 Sean Gannon (musician), drummer for the band, The Magic Numbers